Kolkata Race Course in Hastings, Kolkata, India is the largest horse race venue in India. The race course was built in 1820 and is maintained by the Royal Calcutta Turf Club.

The races are held from the month of July to September, and again from November to March. The races are usually held on Saturdays, and also on other public holidays.

References

External links
Kolkata-india site
Catchcal

Horse racing venues in India
Sports venues in Kolkata
Tourist attractions in Kolkata
Sports venues completed in 1820
1820 establishments in India